Sandra Morin is a Canadian provincial politician. She served as the Saskatchewan New Democratic Party member of the Legislative Assembly of Saskatchewan for the constituency of Regina Walsh Acres from 2003 until 2011, and as  Minister of Culture, Youth and Recreation in the government of Lorne Calvert from May 2007 until the government's defeat in the 2007 Saskatchewan general election. Morin herself lost her seat in the 2011 Saskatchewan general election to Saskatchewan Party candidate Warren Steinley. She chose not to run in the 2016 Saskatchewan general election because of her civilian position with the Royal Canadian Mounted Police.

Morin was nominated to run in Regina Walsh Acres in the 2020 Saskatchewan general election but her nomination was overturned when party leader Ryan Meili declined to endorse her candidacy in August 2020 due to findings of a "confidential vetting process". Morin subsequently announced that she would be running as an Independent. However, she did not win the election.

References

Living people
Year of birth missing (living people)
Saskatchewan New Democratic Party MLAs
Women MLAs in Saskatchewan
Politicians from Regina, Saskatchewan
21st-century Canadian politicians
21st-century Canadian women politicians